Wismoyo Arismunandar (10 February 1940 – 28 January 2021) was an Indonesian high-ranking Army officer who served as Army Chief of Staff from 1993 to 1995 and Commander of Army Strategic Command from 1990 to 1993. He was brother-in-law of Suharto,  the second President of Indonesia. His brother,  was Director General of Electricity and New Energy (1983–1995). Another brother, Wiranto Arismunandar was rector of Bandung Institute of Technology (1988–1997) who was also Minister of Education and Culture (1998).

He died on 28 January 2021. He will be buried in Astana Giribangun.

References  

1940 births
2021 deaths
Javanese people
Indonesian generals
People from Bondowoso Regency